Gislesen is a Norwegian surname. Notable people with the surname include:

Henriette Gislesen (1809–1859), Norwegian writer
Knud Gislesen (1801–1860), Norwegian teacher, clergyman and author

Norwegian-language surnames